Alassane Jatta (born 12 January 1999) is a Gambian professional footballer who plays as a forward for Danish Superliga club Viborg FF.

Career

Paide Linnameeskond
Born in Sukuta, The Gambia, Jatta began playing for Real de Banjul in his home country before moving to Estonian Meistriliiga club Paide Linnameeskond in November 2018. In the first half of the season, Jatta scored 13 goals in 17 league games and was top goalscorer of the Meistriliiga.

Viborg
On 5 August 2019, Jatta signed a four-year contract with Danish 1st Division club Viborg FF. He made his debut for the club on 21 August, coming on as a substitute in the 64th minute for Emil Scheel and scoring his first goal in injury time.

Being part of the Viborg-team winning promotion to the Danish Superliga in the 2020–21 season, Jatta made his debut at the highest level on 18 July 2021, coming on as a substitute for Sofus Berger in a 2–1 away win over Nordsjælland.

In August 2022, Jatta and Viborg teammate Ibrahim Said were unable to travel to England for the club's UEFA Europa Conference League play-off against West Ham United due to English entry rules for non-EU citizens after Brexit.

Honours
Viborg
Danish 1st Division: 2020–21

References

External links
 
 

1999 births
Living people
People from West Coast Division (The Gambia)
Gambian footballers
Gambian expatriate footballers
Association football forwards
Real de Banjul FC players
Paide Linnameeskond players
Viborg FF players
Meistriliiga players
Danish 1st Division players
Danish Superliga players
Expatriate footballers in Estonia
Expatriate men's footballers in Denmark
Gambian expatriate sportspeople in Denmark
Gambian expatriate sportspeople in Estonia